Vortexx was a short-lived American Saturday morning children's television programming block that aired on The CW from August 25, 2012 to September 27, 2014. Programmed by Saban Brands, it replaced Toonzai, a block that was programmed by 4Kids Entertainment until its bankruptcy. The Vortexx block primarily featured animated programs, although it also featured several live-action series, including the Lost Galaxy installment of the Power Rangers franchise (which had been re-acquired by Saban), and the WWE wrestling series WWE Saturday Morning Slam.

The block ended on September 27, 2014, and was replaced by Litton Entertainment's One Magnificent Morning, which features live-action educational programming, the following week – October 4, 2014. It was the conclusive Saturday morning block across the major U.S. broadcast television networks primarily featuring traditional entertainment programming aimed at children. The final program that aired on the block was episode 89 of Yu-Gi-Oh! Zexal, titled "Darkness Dawns" at 11:30 a.m. EDT

History 
On April 6, 2011, following a lawsuit involving the Yu-Gi-Oh! franchise, 4Kids Entertainment, which programmed the CW4Kids/Toonzai block for the network, filed for Chapter 11 bankruptcy protection. On May 1, 2012, Kidsco Media Ventures, an affiliate of Saban Capital Group, placed a bid to acquire some of their assets. On June 26, 2012, after competition from 4K Acquisition Corp, a subsidiary of Konami, the deal was finalized, with 4K Acquisition receiving the U.S. rights to the Yu-Gi-Oh! franchise and Saban receiving all other assets, including the programming rights to The CW's Saturday morning block. On July 2, 2012, it was announced that Saban Capital Group, via Kidsco Media Ventures, would begin programming the block that fall. On July 12, 2012, it was announced that the block would be named Vortexx, which launched on August 25, 2012.

In 2013, Vortexx became the only Saturday morning block without a strictly E/I-based lineup to air on broadcast TV. This happened in November of that year, when Tribune acquired Weigel's 50% stake in This TV, and their Cookie Jar Toons/This Is for Kids block came to an end.

Cancellation and replacement by One Magnificent Morning 
In June 2014, The CW announced that Vortexx would be discontinued and replaced on October 4, 2014 by One Magnificent Morning, a block produced by Litton Entertainment that would feature live-action documentary and lifestyle programs aimed at pre-teens and teenagers, although the block remained until 2014 similarly to a block also introduced by Litton for CW sister channel CBS the previous year. The move came as part of a shift by broadcast television networks towards using their Saturday morning lineup solely to comply with the educational programming requirements mandated by the Federal Communications Commission (FCC), along with the cultural shift towards cable and online video on demand viewing of children's and animated programming. Vortexx aired for the final time on September 27, 2014. It was the last conclusive Saturday morning block across the major American broadcast television networks that primarily featured non-educational programming aimed at children. The KidsClick block from Sinclair Broadcast Group launched on both Sinclair stations and This TV on July 1, 2017, but had no association with a traditional broadcast network otherwise.

Scheduling 
Officially the network preferred the block to air from 7:00 a.m. to Noon in each time zone, though there were local scheduling variances in some areas that may have moved it to different hours, to Sundays, or split the lineup between Saturday or Sunday, along with local pre-emptions of select shows. CW Plus stations in the Central, Mountain, and Alaska time zones time zones also aired the block one hour earlier or later, depending on the local time zone, as The CW Plus operates separate feeds based on the network's Eastern and Pacific time zone scheduling for primetime shows. San Antonio CW affiliate KMYS split the Vortexx block over two days, between early Sunday and early Monday mornings before 5:00 a.m. due to an existing arrangement to air Fox's Weekend Marketplace paid programming block in lieu of sister station KABB.

Past exclusions 
WTVW in Evansville, Indiana (which hurriedly joined The CW on January 31, 2013, due to the market's former affiliate going dark) was unable to schedule the block when it initially began its affiliation with the network, due to contractual obligations to paid programming slots and existing syndicated E/I programming on Saturday mornings through March 2013. The station began carrying Vortexx in its network-recommended timeslot on April 6, 2013, with the station's acquired E/I programming moving to Sunday afternoons.

Video-on-demand 
On April 29, 2013, Saban Brands announced a separate partnership with Kabillion to add programming from the Vortexx block to the existing Kabillion video on demand service for cable providers. The programs were listed on the service without any separate Vortexx subdivision under their individual show titles, with Vortexx promotional advertising. The shows currently remain on Kabillion with other advertising, even with the discontinuance of Vortexx.

Programming 
Most of the block's programming aired in high definition, with older standard definition content presented in 4:3 or widescreen with stylized pillarboxing and windowboxing.

Vortexx only ran an hour of programming that met the FCC's educational programming guidelines; as a result, The CW's affiliates handled the responsibility of filling the remaining two hours, The CW Plus cable-subchannel affiliates had E/I-compliant programs not acquired from the syndication market built into the national schedule, alleviating stations carrying CW network programming via that feed from the responsibility of purchasing the local rights to such programs.

Final programming

Former programming

Special programming 

 	
+ – Former Kids WB program

See also 

 KidsClick, a now-defunct syndicated morning cartoon block owned by Sinclair Broadcast Group.

References 

Brokered programming
Television programming blocks
The CW
Television channels and stations established in 2012
Television channels and stations disestablished in 2015
2012 American television series debuts
2015 American television series endings
Television programming blocks in the United States